Donald Rucker is an American medical informatician and emergency physician. In April 2017, he was appointed National Coordinator for Health Information Technology. Currently he serves as the Chief Strategy Officer at health tech startup 1upHealth.

Career
Rucker has practiced emergency medicine in California, Massachusetts, Pennsylvania, and Ohio. He was Beth Israel Deaconess Medical Center's first full-time attending in the emergency department. His teaching background includes 13 years as assistant professor of emergency medicine at University of Pennsylvania Health System and four years, immediately before his appointment to ONC, as professor of emergency medicine and biomedical informatics at Ohio State University.

For 13 years, Rucker was chief medical officer at Siemens Healthcare. He was also  for worksite clinic provider Premise Health.

Awards
In 2003, Rucker and his team won the HIMSS Nicholas Davies Award for a computerized provider order entry workflow they designed for Cincinnati Children's Hospital.

References

External links
 Google Scholar profile

Trump administration personnel
United States Department of Health and Human Services officials
Health informaticians
American medical academics
20th-century American physicians
21st-century American physicians
Living people
Year of birth missing (living people)
Harvard University alumni
Office of the National Coordinator for Health Information Technology
Stanford Graduate School of Business alumni
Perelman School of Medicine at the University of Pennsylvania alumni